The Realest Real is a 2016 American short film written and directed by Carrie Brownstein.  It is Brownstein's directorial debut.

Cast
Laura Harrier
Natasha Lyonne
Kim Gordon
Rowan Blanchard
Mahershala Ali

Production
The film was shot at the Los Angeles Times Building.

Release
The film was released on September 12, 2016.

References

External links
 

2016 films
2016 short films
Films shot in Los Angeles
American short films
2016 directorial debut films
2010s English-language films